Vibraye is a commune in the Sarthe department in the region of Pays de la Loire in north-western France.

History
Vibraye was involved in the 1906 Grand Prix de l'Automobile Club de France, the world's first motoring Grand Prix. The D1 towards Saint-Calais and La Ferté-Bernard formed a side of the triangular course.

Closest towns and villages

See also
Braye (river)
Communes of the Sarthe department

References

Communes of Sarthe